The 2004 AFC U-17 Championship was the 11th AFC U-17 Championship, which was held between 4 and 18 September 2004 in Japan.

China won their second title after beating Korea DPR 1-0 in the final.

Qualification

Venues
The matches were played in the following five venues. Three venues in the Shizuoka Prefecture and two in the Fukushima Prefecture.

Group stage

Group A

Group B

Group C

Group D

Knockout stages

Knockout Map

Quarter-finals

Semi-finals

Third place play-off

Finals

Winners

Tournament ranking

Goalscorers

Teams qualified for 2005 FIFA U-17 World Championship

References
RSSSF Archive

 
U-17 Championship, 2004
2004
AFC
2004 in youth association football
AFC U-17 Championships